Florence Hein (February 2, 1880 – April 22, 1953) was a Scottish-born American screenwriter in the silent film era, and later worked as actress Pola Negri's personal secretary.

Early life 
Florence was born in Aberdeen, Scotland, to Gustav Hein and Laura Hyde. Her father taught German at a girls' high school in Aberdeen. and was a member of the Aberdeen Philosophical Society. The Hein family immigrated to the United States when Florence was a girl.

Career 
Hein was a screenwriter in the silent film era. She worked in Hollywood at Metro Pictures in the early to mid-1920s. Her first film, The Golden Gift (1922), was directed by Maxwell Karger and starred Alice Lake. She was also announced as scenarist for an Elliott Dexter film titled The Man Who Forgave, in 1923. By 1925 she was private secretary to actress Pola Negri. She attended Rudolph Valentino's funeral with Negri in 1926.

Selected filmography 

 By Divine Right (1924)
 The Scarlet Lily (1923) 
 Refuge (1923) 
 The Golden Gift (1922)

Personal life 
Hein died in Los Angeles in 1953, aged 73 years.

References

External links 

 
 

American women screenwriters
Scottish screenwriters
1880 births
1953 deaths
People from Aberdeen
Writers from Aberdeen
20th-century American women writers
20th-century American screenwriters
20th-century British screenwriters
British emigrants to the United States